Jordan A. Lucas (born August 2, 1993) is an American football safety who is a free agent. He played college football at Penn State University. He was drafted by the Miami Dolphins in the sixth round of the 2016 NFL Draft.

High school
Lucas played at New Rochelle High School for coach Lou DiRienzo and then played one season at Worcester Academy in Worcester, Massachusetts. While at Worcester Academy, Lucas played defensive back and running back for coach David Dykeman and was selected the AA South Section Back of the Year as a senior.

Lucas was rated as a three-star prospect by both Scout and Rivals coming out of high school.

College career
Lucas played at Penn State from 2012 to 2015 playing both cornerback and safety. He started out on defense and special teams as one of only six true freshmen in 2012. He played primarily at the cornerback position from 2013-2014 during his sophomore and junior seasons before switching to play safety for his senior season in 2015. His senior season was cut short due to injury. During his career he had 181 tackles, 3 interceptions, 11 tackles for loss, and 4 sacks.

Career statistics

Professional career

Miami Dolphins
Lucas was drafted by the Miami Dolphins in the sixth round with the 204th overall pick in the 2016 NFL Draft. He played in eight games as a rookie recording two tackles.

On September 2, 2017, Lucas was waived by the Dolphins and was signed to the practice squad the next day. He was promoted to the active roster on October 3, 2017.

Kansas City Chiefs
On August 31, 2018, Lucas was traded to the Kansas City Chiefs for a 2020 seventh-round draft pick. Lucas, who became a restricted free agent following the end of the season, received an original round tender. On April 15, 2019, he officially signed the one-year $1.323 million tender. Lucas won Super Bowl LIV with the Chiefs after defeating the San Francisco 49ers 31-20.

Chicago Bears
Lucas signed with the Chicago Bears on March 26, 2020. He chose to opt-out of the 2020 season due to the COVID-19 pandemic on August 3, 2020.

On August 24, 2021, Lucas was placed on injured reserve. He was removed from injured reserve with an injury settlement on September 1, 2021.

Indianapolis Colts
On September 29, 2021, Lucas was signed to the Indianapolis Colts practice squad. He appeared in one regular season game was released on November 16.

References

1993 births
Living people
American football safeties
Chicago Bears players
Indianapolis Colts players
Kansas City Chiefs players
Miami Dolphins players
Penn State Nittany Lions football players
People from White Plains, New York
Players of American football from New York (state)
Sportspeople from Westchester County, New York
New Rochelle High School alumni